Ashok Upadhyay (born 30 October 1953 in Dongapur, India) is a former Indian cricketer who played 6 first-class matches for Vidarbha cricket team from 1972/73 to 1976/77.

Primarily, a slow left-arm orthodox bowler who was a tail-ended batsman. He took 13 wickets in 6 first-class matches at an average of 38.61 and scored 49 runs in 11 innings that he batted.

Currently, he is manager of Vidarbha cricket team.

References

External links 

 cricinfo
 cricketarchive

1953 births
Living people
Indian cricketers
Vidarbha cricketers
Indian cricket coaches